The Bobonawan River is a river in east-central Bukidnon in Mindanao, Philippines. It is a tributary of the Pulangi River.

References

Rivers of the Philippines
Landforms of Bukidnon